Lullabies to Violaine is a Cocteau Twins box set released in limited quantities by 4AD Records in November 2005. Comprising four CDs, the box set collects the tracks from every Cocteau Twins EP and single from Lullabies to Violaine, except the 1990 "Heaven or Las Vegas" single and the four songs on the 1991 EPs and Singles & Box Set bonus disc. It was also released as two separate double CD packs titled Lullabies to Violaine: Volume 1 and Lullabies to Violaine: Volume 2 the following year.

Track listing 
All tracks written by Elizabeth Fraser, Robin Guthrie and Simon Raymonde; except where indicated.

Disc one 
Lullabies
 "Feathers-Oar-Blades" (Fraser, Guthrie, Will Heggie) – 4:26
 "Alas Dies Laughing" (Fraser, Guthrie, Heggie) – 3:38
 "It's All But an Ark Lark" (Fraser, Guthrie, Heggie) – 8:04
Peppermint Pig
 "Peppermint Pig" (7" version) (Fraser, Guthrie, Heggie) – 3:24
 "Laughlines" (Fraser, Guthrie, Heggie) – 3:19
 "Hazel" (Fraser, Guthrie, Heggie) – 2:49
Sunburst & Snowblind
 "Sugar Hiccup" (12" version) (Fraser, Guthrie) – 3:37
 "From the Flagstones" (Fraser, Guthrie) – 3:38
 "Hitherto" (Fraser, Guthrie) – 3:52
 "Because of Whirl-Jack" (Fraser, Guthrie) – 3:26
The Spangle Maker
 "The Spangle Maker" – 4:40
 "Pearly-Dewdrops' Drops" (alternate version) – 4:47
 "Pepper-Tree" – 3:58
Aikea-Guinea
 "Aikea-Guinea" (alternate version) – 3:57
 "Kookaburra" – 3:18
 "Quisquose" – 4:10
 "Rococo" – 3:05

Disc two 
Tiny Dynamine
 "Pink Orange Red" – 4:37
 "Ribbed and Veined" – 3:55
 "Plain Tiger" – 4:01
 "Sultitan Itan" – 3:49
Echoes in a Shallow Bay
 "Great Spangled Fritillary" – 4:02
 "Melonella" – 4:01
 "Pale Clouded White" – 4:59
 "Eggs and Their Shells" – 3:04
Love's Easy Tears
 "Love's Easy Tears" – 3:35
 "Those Eyes, That Mouth" – 3:38
 "Sigh's Smell of Farewell" – 3:34
 "Orange Appled" – 2:49
Iceblink Luck
 "Iceblink Luck" – 3:15
 "Mizake the Mizan" – 3:00
 "Watchlar" – 3:16

Disc three 
Evangeline
 "Evangeline" – 4:29
 "Mud and Dark" – 3:40
 "Summer-Blink" – 3:10
Snow
 "Winter Wonderland" (Dick Smith, Felix Bernard) – 2:51
 "Frosty the Snowman" (Jack Rollins, Steve Nelson) – 2:55
Bluebeard
 "Bluebeard" – 3:54
 "Three-Swept" – 3:37
 "Ice-Pulse" – 3:46
 "Bluebeard" (acoustic version) – 3:05
Twinlights
 "Rilkean Heart" (acoustic version) – 2:21
 "Golden-Vein" (acoustic version) – 2:50
 "Pink Orange Red" (acoustic version) – 4:30
 "Half-Gifts" (acoustic version) – 4:14

Disc four 
Otherness
 "Feet-Like Fins" (Fraser, Guthrie) – 5:31
 "Seekers Who Are Lovers" – 5:40
 "Violaine" – 5:07
 "Cherry-Coloured Funk" – 5:46
 All tracks remixed by Mark Clifford
Tishbite
 "Tishbite" – 3:12
 "Primitive Heart" – 4:07
 "Flock of Soul" – 3:36
 "Round" – 3:36
 "An Elan" – 4:36
Violaine
 "Violaine" – 3:47
 "Smile" – 4:27
 "Tranquil Eye" – 3:53
 "Circling Girl" – 3:33
 "Alice" – 4:27

Notes

Disc one 
 Lullabies: Released October 1982 through 4AD.
 Produced by Ivo Watts-Russell. Recorded at Palladium Studios, Edinburgh, engineered by Jon Turner. Mixed at Blackwing Studios, London, engineered by John Fryer.
 Peppermint Pig: Released March 1983 through 4AD.
 Produced by Alan Rankine. Engineered by John Fryer. Recorded at Blackwing Studios, London.
 Sunburst and Snowblind: Released November 1983 through 4AD.
 Produced by Cocteau Twins and John Fryer, except “Sugar Hiccup” and “Hitherto,” produced by Cocteau Twins. Recorded and mixed at Palladium Studios, Edinburgh.
 The Spangle Maker: Released April 1984 through 4AD.
 Produced by Cocteau Twins. “The Spangle Maker” and “Pepper-Tree” recorded at Palladium Studios, Edinburgh, engineered by Jon Turner and mixed at Rooster, London, engineered by John Madden. “Pearly-Dewdrops’ Drops” recorded and engineered by John Madden at Rooster, London.
 Aikea-Guinea: Released March 1985 through 4AD.
 Produced by Cocteau Twins. Engineered by Ken Thomas. Recorded at Jacobs Studios, Farnham.

Disc two 
 Tiny Dynamine: Released November 1985 through 4AD.
 Produced by Cocteau Twins. Recorded at Guerilla, London. Mixed at Aosis, London.
 Echoes in a Shallow Bay: Released November 1985 through 4AD.
 Produced by Cocteau Twins. Recorded at Guerilla, London. Mixed at Aosis, London.
 Love's Easy Tears: Released October 1986 through 4AD.
 Produced by Cocteau Twins. Recorded and mixed at Good Earth, London.
 Iceblink Luck: Released August 1990 through 4AD/Capitol.
 Produced by Cocteau Twins. Recorded and mixed at September Sound, London.

Disc three 
 Evangeline: Released September 1993 through Fontana/Mercury.
 Produced by Cocteau Twins. Recorded and mixed at September Sound, London. Additional engineering by Lincoln Fong. Additional guitars on “Evangeline” by Mitsuo Tate and Ben Blakeman.
 Snow: Released December 1993 through Fontana/Mercury & Capitol.
 Produced by Cocteau Twins. Recorded and mixed at September Sound, London. Additional engineering by Lincoln Fong. “Winter Wonderland” written by Felix Bernard and Dick Smith. “Frosty the Snowman” written by Jack Rollings and Steve Nelson.
 Bluebeard: Released February 1994 through Fontana/Mercury & Capitol.
 Produced by Cocteau Twins. Recorded and mixed at September Sound, London. Additional engineering by Lincoln Fong.
 Twinlights: Released September 1995 through Fontana/Mercury & Capitol. 
 Produced by Cocteau Twins. Recorded and mixed at September Sound, London. Additional recordings at Wessex, London. String arrangements for “Half-Gifts” by Thomas M. Hill.

Disc four 
 Otherness: Released October 1995 through Fontana/Mercury & Capitol.
 Recycled by Mark Clifford. Mixed at September Sound and Polyfusion, London.
 Tishbite: Released March 1996 through Fontana/Mercury & Capitol.
 Produced by Cocteau Twins. Recorded at September Sound, London. Additional engineering by Des Ward, Mitsuo Tate, and Lincoln Fong.
 Violaine: Released October 1996 though Fontana/Mercury & Capitol.
 Produced by Cocteau Twins. Recorded at September Sound, London. Additional engineering by Mitsuo Tate.

References 

Cocteau Twins albums
2005 compilation albums
4AD compilation albums